Retfala is a city district in the western part of Osijek, Croatia. It has 14,123 inhabitants distributed in 5,200 households. It borders Gornji grad to the east, Tvrđavica to the northeast, Višnjevac to the west and Industrijska četvrt to the south.

Day of the city district is on 14 September, on Exaltation of the Holy Cross.

Its name in Hungarian literally means "village in meadow".

History  

Retfala is first mentioned in the end 17th century.

From 1750 it was estate of the family of Pejačević.

From 19th century it was independent municipality.

From 1947 it is a city district of the City of Osijek.

References 

Districts of Osijek